The Old Dominion University Monarch Marching Band (MMB) is the Marching Band put in place in response to the formation of the Old Dominion Monarchs football program. It was founded in the summer of 2008 and is currently active. It is currently being headed by Dr. Alexander R. Treviño The Monarch Marching Band goes to all of the home football games and plays in the pre-game, stands, and halftime. The band prides itself on the fact that it does not do the same show for every football game, and it is fairly rare for the band to play the same song more than once for halftime.

Sections

The MMB has a standard line up of sections for a college band. All of the wind instruments are silver and can be provided by the university.

Instruments are: 
Piccolos,
Clarinets,
Saxophones,
Mellophones,
Trumpets,
Trombones,
Baritones,
Sousaphones,
Snares,
Tenors,
Bass drums,
Cymbals, and
Color guard.

Traditions
Even as a young Marching Band, The MMB has many traditions starting already. One such tradition is yelling “Pride” after the conclusion of each practice and game. This has a double meaning as it means both pride in the sense of being proud to be a Monarch, and also pride being what a grouping of lions is called.
Another tradition of the MMB is to pet the lion bust's muzzle at the entrance of the Foreman Field.

Uniforms
The uniforms for the MMB are quite representative of the city they reside in. Norfolk, Virginia houses a huge Naval station (Naval Station Norfolk) and almost in respect of that, their uniforms look very Navy-like. The pants come up in an overall fashion and the coat is a high cut, button-from- the-shoulder type of style. The Shako looks almost identical to a Naval Peaked cap. The color scheme of the uniform is the schools colors, Royal Blue and white. Coincidentally this is also the colors of the Navy. The uniform is adorned with multiple university logos. 'Old Dominion University' on the right shoulder, and the diagonal ODU with crown logo on the left shoulder. The lion shield logo is on the front of the jacket, with M-O-N-A-R-C-H-S spelled vertically down the back. On the front of the Shako, the horizontal ODU with crown logo is present.

Pep Band
Members of the Marching Band make up the University's Basketball Band, which goes to all the Men's and Women's Basketball home-games. If one wants to be a member of the Basketball Band then they have to have been part of the marching band. Each of the 60 members of the band get a $500 stipend. Anybody out of that 60 are also allowed to participate, but they go stipend-less.

Other Pep Bands are formed for specific Field Hockey and Soccer games, these are also formed from the marching band and they are strictly voluntary.

References

External links
 Official Monarch Marching Band Webpage
 Official Facebook Page
 Official Twitter
 Official Youtube

Sun Belt Conference marching bands
Musical groups established in 2008
Old Dominion University
2008 establishments in Virginia